Michael S. Wilson (born 1970) is an American business executive, video game producer, and film-maker. Beginning his career at DWANGO as Vice President of Development before being hired to lead marketing and publishing at id Software in 1995, Wilson has subsequently co-founded multiple independent video game publishers, including Gathering of Developers, Gamecock Media Group, Devolver Digital, Good Shepherd Entertainment, and DeepWell DTx.

Wilson has been a featured speaker at South by Southwest, Reboot Red, Reboot Blue, E3, the International Games Summit on Mental Health Awareness, Game Developers Conference, and many more, and is a vocal advocate for mental health in games, and self-care and unionization in the world of independent game development. In 2019, he called on the industry to start grappling with the reality of video game addiction and begin taking active measures to curb its effects through "being more intentional about the content we create."

Wilson has served as a partner and frontman for Devolver Digital since co-founding the company in 2009 and concurrently served as Chief Creative Officer for Good Shepherd from 2012 through 2020. He also currently sits on the advisory board of Take This, a non-profit dedicated to raising awareness about mental health issues for video game professionals within the industry.

In 2019, Wilson co-founded Transcend Victoria, a Victoria, British Columbia-based entertainment company dedicated creating "immediate, interactive art" designed to bring people offline and together in shared physical spaces.

Wilson currently serves as the co-founder and co-chief executive officer of DeepWell DTx, a video game publisher and developer "dedicated to creating best-in-class gameplay that can simultaneously entertain and deliver, enhance, and accelerate treatment for an array of globally pervasive health conditions."

Career

DWANGO 
Wilson began his career in his early 20s as Vice President of Development for DWANGO, an early online gaming service based in the United States, which pioneered the use of a nationwide network of dial-up servers to host multiplayer sessions of Doom, Quake, Duke Nukem 3D, Shadow, and Heretic, and other popular video game titles.

Following the platform's explosion in popularity, Wilson left DWANGO in 1995 to join Doom developer id Software to bolster the company's first forays into game publishing.

id Software 
Joining id Software in 1995 to help lead marketing for the company's gaming catalog, and subsequently oversaw the launches of several prominent games in id's line-up, including new installments of the Doom and Heretic/Hexen franchises. Wilson also led the launch the retail shareware version of Quake through use of encrypted CD-ROMs (and later DVDs), making the titles readily available to all major retailers and, for the first time, 7-Eleven stores nationwide.

Ion Storm 
Wilson left id Software at the beginning of 1997 to join John Romero and Tom Hall for the launch of the game development company, Ion Storm. Wilson served as chief executive officer from February 1997 to the end of 1997, overseeing the company's growth from 8 to 88 employees in under a year. Wilson and other executives exited Ion Storm following a public conflict with another partner in the company, Todd Porter, who became chief executive officer after Wilson's departure. Before departing to found Gathering of Developers, Wilson joined Romero on his trip to Austin to recruit Warren Spector onto the Ion team, subsequently leading to the creation of the Deus Ex franchise in the company's Austin development studio..

Gathering of Developers 
In January 1998, Wilson – in partnership with Harry Miller, the chief executive officer of Ritual Entertainment, and several other independent development studios including 3D Realms, Epic Games, Terminal Reality, and PopTop Software – founded Gathering of Developers. Gathering was founded as an artist-friendly, developer-driven publishing operation which would brand its developers above the publishing label and permit them to own their intellectual property, thereby earning the highest royalty rates in the industry at that time. Funded through distribution and co-publishing deals by Take-Two Interactive, Gathering published several PC games including Railroad Tycoon 2, Stronghold, Serious Sam, Tropico, Darkstone, Mafia, and, finally, Max Payne following the company's acquisition by Take-Two in May 2000.

Following the sudden death of Gathering co-founder Doug Myres in the summer of 2001, Wilson and Miller, along with the majority of Texas-based talent at Gathering, departed Take-Two to form SubstanceTV.

SubstanceTV 
After leaving Take-Two in 2001, Wilson took the majority of Gathering's employees with him to a new start-up video-magazine on DVD called SubstanceTV. SubstanceTV's focus was aimed at alternative, non-mainstream content such as music videos, short films, original short documentaries, and other content not available elsewhere. Unable to make the venture work commercially, Wilson winded it down in August 2002 after publishing seven issues.

Take-Two Interactive 
In 2002, Wilson returned to Take-Two as Executive Vice President of A&R. Wilson spent the next several years holding dual roles in the worlds of gaming and film, jointly shepherding projects for Take-Two and his own Gone Off Deep Productions film imprint, which released the documentary Burning Man: Beyond Black Rock in 2005.  Wilson has continued to produce multiple feature-length and short-form film projects via Gone Off Deep in recent years, including 2011's Austin High  and 2016's Stand Up Empire.

Gamecock Media Group 
On February 12, 2007, Mike Wilson and his partners Harry Miller and Rick Stults announced the formation of Gamecock Media Group, a new video game publisher that "they hope will act as the equivalent of an independent film company for small game developers." Gamecock was acquired by SouthPeak Games in October 2008, after releasing several titles including Mushroom Men for Wii and Nintendo DS, Dementium: The Ward for Nintendo DS, Hail to the Chimp for Xbox 360 and PlayStation 3, Legendary for Xbox 360 and PlayStation 3, Stronghold: Crusader Extreme for PC, Insecticide for PC and Nintendo DS, and Fury for PC. Southpeak dissolved the brand and released later Gamecock titles, such as Velvet Assassin and Section 8 under their own label.

Devolver Digital 
In spring 2008, Mike Wilson rejoined Harry Miller, Rick Stults, and several other former partners to found Devolver Digital, a producer/publisher hybrid initially working with Croteam – creators of the Serious Sam franchise that Wilson and Miller helped establish while with Gathering of Developers.  WIlson has served as a founding partner and spokesperson of Devolver Digital since its inception.

Devolver's first release, Serious Sam HD: The First Encounter, came out in November 2009 on PC and January 2010 on Xbox Live Arcade.  Serious Sam HD: The Second Encounter was released in May 2010 on PC and September 22 on XBLA. After the release of Serious Sam 3: BFE in 2011, Devolver decided to shift its focus from larger development cycles to the emerging indie gaming scene.  Using the Serious Sam series as a test bed for indie development and relations, Devolver worked with developer Vlambeer to release Serious Sam: The Random Encounter in October 2011. Since then, Devolver has gone on to release Hotline Miami with developer Dennaton Games, selling over two million copies on Steam alone as of October, 2016.

Since 2017, Devolver has released more than 50 new game titles, including Hotline Miami 2: Wrong Number, Gris, Reigns, My Friend Pedro, and multiple installments of the acclaimed Enter the Gungeon and Shadow Warrior franchises. In 2020, the company, in concert with UK-based developer Mediatonic, released its biggest hit to date with Fall Guys: Ultimate Knockout, which sold more than two million copies on Steam within a week of its release. Heralded as “the perfect game for the coronavirus age” by USA Today, the game's near-instantaneous success has been attributed to its non-violent, joyfully communal gameplay, which has been called “a salve to social isolation and an escape from the constant barrage of bad news” during the 2020 global pandemic.

In 2020, Devolver announced its first television project with an adaptation of My Friend Pedro, to be written and executive produced by John Wick creator Derek Kolstad. Envisioned as an “R-rated, half-hour dramedy,” Wilson will serve as an executive producer on the series, alongside Legendary Entertainment, DJ2 Entertainment, and Deadpool 2 director David Leitch.

Devolver Digital Films
At SXSW 2013, Devolver announced that they would be extending the brand to digital film distribution. Wilson sperheaded Devolver's film distribution arm, bringing in partner Andie Grace as the company's VP of Acquisitions – a move prompted by Steam's then-new move into the distribution of films and videos.  In 2019, both Steam and Devolver ceased its acquisition of independent films, due to Steam refocusing its efforts on VR. Devolver had released more than 75 films on Steam and other various digital platforms before shuttering the division.

Good Shepherd Entertainment 
In 2012, Wilson co-founded Good Shepherd Entertainment (formerly known as Gambitious Digital Entertainment) alongside Harry Miller, Paul Hanraets, and Andy Payne, where he served as Chief Creative Officer until 2020. The company was founded to further Devolver's core philosophies of fairness and equitably for game creators, but operate at a smaller scale with a focus on games budgeted at under $1 million, a stated emphasis on quality, and the ability to allow independent investors to invest alongside the label for each title.

Since 2014, Good Shepherd has released more than 25 games with an average 30 percent profit on each title.  Their catalog includes the Transport Fever series, Semblance, Phantom Doctrine, and Where the Water Tastes Like Wine, which features voiceover work by Grammy Award-winning musician Sting.  

In 2019, Good Shepherd released John Wick Hex – its first game to be based on a major entertainment property – which was developed to fit canonically within the universe of Lionsgate’s John Wick film franchise and featured actors Ian McShane and Lance Reddick reprising their roles from John Wick: Chapter 2.

Take This 
In March 2018, Wilson was appointed to the board of Take This, a Washington-based non-profit organization founded in 2013 by video game journalists Russ Pitts and Susan Arendt and clinical psychologist Dr. Mark Kline.  The organization is dedicated to providing resources and channels for mental health discussions for professionals in the video game industry. It also regularly publishes white papers addressing the industry’s controversial working conditions, such as “crunch time,”  and provides AFK (“away from keyboard”) rooms for relaxation purposes at busy gaming industry conventions, including PAX, in addition to other programs in person and online.

DeepWell DTx 
In 2022, Wilson announced the creation of DeepWell Digital Therapeutics (DTx), a new video game publisher and developer dedicated to creating “medically therapeutic games”  that can be used to treat an array of medical and mental health conditions, including “depression, anxiety, and hypertension”, while maintaining “best-in-class gameplay”  and entertainment value for players.

DeepWell was co-founded by Wilson alongside Ryan Douglas, a medical device expert  and former chief executive officer of international medical technology company Nextern.  As of March 2022, DeepWell had “more than 40 game designers, medical researchers, scientists, and creators”  – including Tom Hall (Doom), Zoe Flower (Hellbent Games), Rami Ismail (Nuclear Throne), Lorne Lanning (Oddworld), American McGee (American McGee's Alice), and others – working toward the release of the company’s first game, slated for a projected 2023 release.

In addition to its own games, the company has also announced its intent to create and license “a suite of processes that follow FDA guidelines”  to assist other independent “developers in designing and repurposing games to bring out therapeutic value”  for new and other pre-existing game titles.

Games

Filmography

References

External links 
 Gamasutra: The Strange History of Gamecock's Mike Wilson
 

1970 births
American chief executives
Living people
Video game businesspeople
Place of birth missing (living people)